Ni una menos (Spanish for "Not one [woman] less") is a Latin American fourth-wave grassroots feminist movement, which started in Argentina and has spread across several Latin American countries, that campaigns against gender-based violence. In its official website,  defines itself as a "collective scream against machista violence." The campaign was started by a collective of Argentine female artists, journalists and academics, and has grown into "a continental alliance of feminist forces". The movement regularly holds protests against femicides, but has also touched on topics such as gender roles, sexual harassment, gender pay gap, sexual objectification, legality of abortion, sex workers' rights and transgender rights.

The movement became nationally recognized with the use of the hashtag #NiUnaMenos on social media, title under which massive demonstrations were held on June 3, 2015, having the Palace of the Argentine National Congress as a main meeting point. The protest was organized after the murder of 14-year-old Chiara Paez, found buried underneath her boyfriend's house on May 11, because she wanted to keep the baby and he did not, so he beat her to death when she was a few weeks pregnant. A viral phenomenon which extended to countries such as Uruguay and Chile, it managed to congregate around 200,000 people in Buenos Aires alone. On June 3, 2016 the multitudinous demonstration took place once again throughout Argentina's most important cities, under the new slogan #VivasNosQueremos (English: #WeWantUsAlive); the march was also replicated in Montevideo, Uruguay and Santiago, Chile. A #NiUnaMenos march also took place in Lima, Peru on August 13, 2016, with thousands of people gathering in front of the Palace of Justice. Newspaper La República considered it the largest demonstration in Peruvian history.

On October 19, 2016 the  collective organized a first-ever women mass strike in Argentina, in response to the murder of 16-year-old Lucía Pérez, who was raped and impaled in the coastal city of Mar del Plata. These protests became region-wide and gave the movement a greater international momentum, with street demonstrations also taking place in Chile, Peru, Bolivia, Paraguay, Uruguay, El Salvador, Guatemala, Mexico and Spain. A week later, a protest also took place in Rio de Janeiro,
Brazil,  which has been considered "yet another clear sign that  has become a rallying cry for the region." On March 8, 2017,  took part of the International Women's Strike.

Since the first #NiUnaMenos in 2015, demonstrations take place every year in Argentina on June 3.

In 2016, Argentine scientists Julián Petrulevičius and Pedro Gutiérrez named , a dragonfly species found in La Rioja, after the movement. The genus  was chosen in honor of Túpac Amaru II and Milagro Sala's organization named after him.

Origin
The collective takes its name from a 1995 phrase by Mexican poet and activist Susana Chávez, "" (Spanish for "Not one more [woman] dead"), in protest to the female homicides in Ciudad Juárez. Chávez herself was assassinated in 2011, moment in which the phrase became a "symbol of struggle".

Accomplishments

 2020 legalization of abortion in Argentina: First-trimester elective abortion in Argentina was legalized on 30 December 2020.
 Creation of the Registry of Femicides
 Creation of the Centre for the Registration, Systematisation, and Monitoring of Femicides 
 Created to keep a record of the number of cases of gender-based violence

Criticism 
The movement has been criticized by some journalists, especially since 2017, for some of its demands, such as the freedom of Milagro Sala.

See also

2017 Women's March
Ele Não movement (Brazil, 2018)
Feminism in Latin America
Feminism in Argentina
Feminism in Chile
Feminism in Mexico
Women in Argentina
Women in Chile
Women in Paraguay
Women in Peru
Women in Uruguay
Gender inequality in Bolivia
LGBT rights in Argentina
 List of protests in the 21st century

References

External links

2015 protests
2016 protests
2017 protests
2018 protests
2019 protests
2020 protests
Fourth-wave feminism
Feminist organisations in Argentina
Political movements in Argentina
2015 establishments in Argentina
Feminist protests
Women's marches
Violence against women in Argentina